Lucien-L'Allier station is a commuter rail terminal in Montreal, Quebec, Canada. It is the terminal for Exo's Vaudreuil-Hudson, Saint-Jérôme, and Candiac lines. Lucien-L'Allier is in ARTM fare zone A. It is one of the two downtown terminals for Montreal commuter trains, the other being Montreal Central Station.

Origin of name
Lucien L'Allier station takes its name from the nearby Lucien L'Allier Montreal Metro station. This station is in turn named for rue Lucien-L'Allier, the original name of which, rue de l'Aqueduc, was changed in order to commemorate Lucien L'Allier, chief engineer for the initial network of the Montreal Metro and for the construction of Saint Helen's Island and Île Notre-Dame for Expo 67.

Originally, the terminus of the commuter rail line was the monumental Windsor Station (Gare Windsor), which was also the headquarters of Canadian Pacific Railway until it moved to Calgary in 1996. This station was separated from the rails by the construction of the Molson Centre (now Bell Centre), which integrated a new commuter train terminal. Originally called Terminus Windsor, this new terminal was renamed Gare Lucien-L'Allier to reduce confusion with the original Windsor Station, which still exists but is no longer a train station.

Location
The station is located at 1290 Avenue des Canadiens-de-Montréal (the street was formerly called Rue de la Gauchetière), near the historic Windsor Station, and is connected by an enclosed walkway to Lucien-L'Allier Metro station.

Terminus Lucien-L'Allier is the eastern end of the Canadian Pacific Railway's Westmount Subdivision.

Connections

STM bus routes

For STM bus routes see Lucien-L'Allier (Montreal Metro)

Metro stations
 Lucien-L'Allier (Orange Line)

References

External links

 Official website, Vaudreuil-Hudson Line (In French)
 AMT Montreal-Dorion
 Official website, Saint-Jérôme Line (In French)
 AMT Montréal Saint-Jérome
 Official website, Candiac Line (In French)
 AMT Montreal-Candiac
 STM 2011 System Map

Exo commuter rail stations
Railway stations in Montreal
Railway stations in Canada opened in 1999
Downtown Montreal